Art Moreau (born 1936) is an American former politician in the state of Washington. He served the 42nd district from 1975 to 1979.

References

Living people
1936 births
Politicians from Bellingham, Washington
Democratic Party members of the Washington House of Representatives